Mansur ibn Sa'id was an Iranian statesman, who served as the Head of the Army Department during the reign of the Ghaznavid Sultan Ibrahim of Ghazna (r. 1059–1099). Mansur was the son of Sa'id Maymandi, who was the son of the former Ghaznavid vizier Ahmad Maymandi.

Sources 
 

Year of death unknown
11th-century births
11th-century Iranian politicians
Ghaznavid officials